The Destroyed City (Dutch: De verwoeste stad) is a bronze memorial sculpture in the Dutch city of Rotterdam.  It commemorates the German bombing of Rotterdam on 14 May 1940, which destroyed the medieval centre of the city. Unveiled in 1953, it was designated as a Dutch national monument (Rijksmonument) in 2010. It is the largest sculpture by the Russian-born French sculptor Ossip Zadkine, his best known work, and the best known sculpture in Rotterdam.

The figure holds both hands aloft, with its head thrown back as if crying in grief, and a gaping hole in its chest and abdomen. The absence of a heart is said to symbolise the destruction of the centre of Rotterdam. Zadkine described it as "A cry of horror against the inhuman brutality of this act of tyranny". The sculpture has been compared to the figure with arms raised in terror on the far right of Picasso's painting Guernica.
 
Zadkine's work was influenced by Rodin and by Cubism. He was inspired to create the sculpture shortly after the end of the Second World War, probably 1946 or 1947, when his train passed through the ruined centre of Rotterdam while travelling from Paris to visit his friend, the doctor and painter , in the Dutch town of Deurne. A bronze model was exhibited at the Museum Boijmans Van Beuningen in Rotterdam in December 1949.

The full-size bronze sculpture was created from 1951 to 1953 and cast by the Susse Frères foundry in Paris. It was presented to the city as an anonymous gift, on condition that its location should be chosen by Zadkine, and it should remain permanently in place; the identity of the donor became known in 1978. Tillema condemned the sculpture as a "madly demonic scourge" that would "paralyze the heart of my city forever". Despite his objections, ultimately the gift was accepted, and Tillema was responsible for designing the plinth. The statue was donated, but installation, including the plinth, cost 24,500 guilders.  

It was restored while temporarily removed in 2005 to allow construction works, and returned to its place in 2007. It was registered as a Rijksmonument (number 530902) in 2010. A proposal made in 2014 to move the sculpture again to a prominent position outside the new Rotterdam Centraal station was soon abandoned.  

It has received many nicknames from the residents of Rotterdam, including "Stad zonder Hart" (City without a heart), "Zadkini", “Jan Gat” (Jan Hole) and "Jan met de Handjes" (Jan with the little hands).

In February 2019, the sculpture and its emotional impact were discussed in the BBC Radio 4 programme Pen Pals.

References

 The destroyed city, Sculpture International Rotterdam
 Monument 'De Verwoeste Stad' Rotterdam, tracesofwar.nl
 Sculpture in Rotterdam, edited by Jan van Adrichem, Jelle Bouwhuis, Mariette Dölle, p.200-201
 Monumentnummer: 530902 De Verwoeste Stad te Rotterdam, Rijksdienst voor het Cultureel Erfgoed
 Unveiling of The Destroyed City, Platform Wederopbouw Rotterdam

1953 sculptures
Bronze sculptures in the Netherlands
Buildings and structures in Rotterdam
Rijksmonuments in Rotterdam
Sculptures by Ossip Zadkine
World War II memorials in the Netherlands